The 41st United States Congress was a meeting of the legislative branch of the United States federal government, consisting of the United States Senate and the United States House of Representatives. It met in Washington, D.C. from March 4, 1869, to March 4, 1871, during the first two years of Ulysses S. Grant's presidency. The apportionment of seats in the House of Representatives was based on the 1860 United States census. Both chambers had a Republican majority.

Major events

 March 4, 1869: Ulysses Grant became President of the United States
 March 4, 1869: Carl Schurz R-Missouri became the first German American to serve in the United States Senate
 May 10, 1869: Golden spike marked the completion of the First transcontinental railroad in Promontory, Utah
 December 10, 1869: Wyoming Territory gave women the right to vote, one of the first such laws in the world
 February 12, 1870: Utah Territory gave women the right to vote
 February 25, 1870: Senator Hiram Rhodes Revels became the first African American in the U.S. Congress

Major legislation

 March 18, 1869: Public Credit Act of 1869, Sess. 1, ch. 1, 
 April 10, 1869: Judiciary Act of 1869, Sess. 1, ch. 22, 
 May 31, 1870: Enforcement Act of 1870, Sess. 2, ch. 114, 
 June 22, 1870: An Act to establish the Department of Justice, Sess. 2, ch. 150, 
 June 29, 1870: An Act to reorganize the Marine Hospital Service, Sess. 2, ch. 169, 
 July 12, 1870: Currency Act of 1870, Sess. 2, ch. 252, 
 July 14, 1870: Funding Act of 1870, Sess. 2, ch. 256, 
 February 21, 1871: District of Columbia Organic Act of 1871, Sess. 3, ch. 62,

Constitutional amendments 
 February 3, 1870: Fifteenth Amendment was ratified by the requisite number of states (then 28) to become part of the Constitution

States readmitted 
 January 26, 1870: Virginia rejoined the Union
 February 23, 1870: Mississippi rejoined the Union
 March 30, 1870: Texas rejoined the Union
 July 15, 1870: Georgia rejoined the Union, the last former Confederate state to be readmitted

Party summary 

The count below identifies party affiliations at the beginning of the first session of this Congress, and includes members from vacancies and newly admitted states, when they were first seated. Changes resulting from subsequent replacements are shown below in the "Changes in membership" section.

During this Congress, Virginia, Mississippi, Texas, and Georgia were readmitted to representation.

Senate

House of Representatives

Leadership

Senate 
 President: Schuyler Colfax (R)
 President pro tempore: Henry B. Anthony (R)

House of Representatives 
 Speaker: James G. Blaine (R)
 Republican Conference Chairman: Robert C. Schenck and Nathaniel P. Banks
 Democratic Caucus Chairman: William E. Niblack and Samuel J. Randall

Members
This list is arranged by chamber, then by state. Senators are listed then by class and representatives are listed then by district.
Skip to House of Representatives, below

Senate
Senators were elected by the state legislatures every two years, with one-third beginning new six-year terms with each Congress. Preceding the names in the list below are Senate class numbers, which indicate the cycle of their election. In this Congress, "Class 1" meant their term began in this Congress, facing re-election in 1874; "Class 2" meant their term ended in this Congress, facing re-election in 1870; and "Class 3" meant their term began in the last Congress, facing re-election in 1872.

Alabama 
 2. Willard Warner (R)
 3. George E. Spencer (R)

Arkansas 
 2. Alexander McDonald (R)
 3. Benjamin F. Rice (R)

California 
 1. Eugene Casserly (D)
 3. Cornelius Cole (R)

Connecticut 
 1. William A. Buckingham (R)
 3. Orris S. Ferry (R)

Delaware 
 1. Thomas F. Bayard (D)
 2. Willard Saulsbury Sr. (D)

Florida 
 1. Abijah Gilbert (R)
 3. Thomas W. Osborn (R)

Georgia 
 2. Homer V. M. Miller (D), from February 24, 1871
 3. Joshua Hill (R), from February 1, 1871

Illinois 
 2. Richard Yates (R)
 3. Lyman Trumbull (R)

Indiana 
 1. Daniel D. Pratt (R)
 3. Oliver H. P. T. Morton (R)

Iowa 
 2. James W. Grimes (R), until December 6, 1869
 James B. Howell (R), from January 18, 1870
 3. James Harlan (R)

Kansas 
 2. Edmund G. Ross (R)
 3. Samuel C. Pomeroy (R)

Kentucky 
 2. Thomas C. McCreery (D)
 3. Garrett Davis (D)

Louisiana 
 2. John S. Harris (R)
 3. William P. Kellogg (R)

Maine 
 1. Hannibal Hamlin (R)
 2. William P. Fessenden (R), until September 8, 1869
 Lot M. Morrill (R), from October 30, 1869

Maryland 
 1. William T. Hamilton (D)
 3. George Vickers (D)

Massachusetts 
 1. Charles Sumner (R)
 2. Henry Wilson (R)

Michigan 
 1. Zachariah Chandler (R)
 2. Jacob M. Howard (R)

Minnesota 
 1. Alexander Ramsey (R)
 2. Daniel S. Norton (R), until July 13, 1870
 William Windom (R), July 15, 1870 – January 22, 1871
 Ozora P. Stearns (R), from January 22, 1871

Mississippi 
 1. Adelbert Ames (R), from February 23, 1870
 2. Hiram R. Revels (R), from February 23, 1870

Missouri 
 1. Carl Schurz (R)
 3. Charles D. Drake (R), until December 19, 1870
 Daniel T. Jewett (R), December 19, 1870 – January 20, 1871
 Francis P. Blair Jr. (D), from January 20, 1871

Nebraska 
 1. Thomas Tipton (R)
 2. John M. Thayer (R)

Nevada 
 1. William M. Stewart (R)
 3. James W. Nye (R)

New Hampshire 
 2. Aaron H. Cragin (R)
 3. James W. Patterson (R)

New Jersey 
 1. John P. Stockton (D)
 2. Alexander G. Cattell (R)

New York 
 1. Reuben Fenton (R)
 3. Roscoe Conkling (R)

North Carolina 
 2. Joseph C. Abbott (R)
 3. John Pool (R)

Ohio 
 1. Allen G. Thurman (D)
 3. John Sherman (R)

Oregon 
 2. George H. Williams (R)
 3. Henry W. Corbett (R)

Pennsylvania 
 1. John Scott (R)
 3. Simon Cameron (R)

Rhode Island 
 1. William Sprague (R)
 2. Henry B. Anthony (R)

South Carolina 
 2. Thomas J. Robertson (R)
 3. Frederick A. Sawyer (R)

Tennessee 
 1. William G. Brownlow (R)
 2. Joseph S. Fowler (R)

Texas 
 1. James W. Flanagan (R), from March 30, 1870
 2. Morgan C. Hamilton (R), from March 31, 1870

Vermont 
 1. George F. Edmunds (R)
 3. Justin S. Morrill (R)

Virginia 
 2. John W. Johnston (D), from January 26, 1870
 1. John F. Lewis (R), from January 26, 1870

West Virginia 
 1. Arthur I. Boreman (R)
 2. Waitman T. Willey (R)

Wisconsin 
 1. Matthew H. Carpenter (R)
 3. Timothy O. Howe (R)

House of Representatives
The names of members of the House of Representatives are preceded by their district numbers.

Alabama 
 . Alfred E. Buck (R)
 . Charles W. Buckley (R)
 . Robert S. Heflin (R)
 . Charles Hays (R)
 . Peter M. Dox (D)
 . William C. Sherrod (D)

Arkansas 
 . Logan H. Roots (R)
 . Anthony A. C. Rogers (D)
 . Thomas Boles (R)

California 
 . Samuel B. Axtell (D)
 . Aaron A. Sargent (R)
 . James A. Johnson (D)

Connecticut 
 . Julius L. Strong (R)
 . Stephen W. Kellogg (R)
 . Henry H. Starkweather (R)
 . William H. Barnum (D)

Delaware 
 . Benjamin T. Biggs (D)

Florida 
 . Charles M. Hamilton (R)

Georgia 
 . William W. Paine (D), from December 22, 1870
 . Richard H. Whiteley (R), from December 22, 1870
 . Marion Bethune (R), from December 22, 1870
 . Jefferson F. Long (R), from January 16, 1871
 . Stephen A. Corker (D), from January 24, 1871
 . William P. Price (D), from December 22, 1870
 . Pierce M. B. Young (D), from December 22, 1870

Illinois 
 . Norman B. Judd (R)
 . John F. Farnsworth (R)
 . Elihu B. Washburne (R), until March 6, 1869
 Horatio C. Burchard (R), from December 6, 1869
 . John B. Hawley (R)
 . Ebon C. Ingersoll (R)
 . Burton C. Cook (R)
 . Jesse H. Moore (R)
 . Shelby M. Cullom (R)
 . Thompson W. McNeely (D)
 . Albert G. Burr (D)
 . Samuel S. Marshall (D)
 . John B. Hay (R)
 . John M. Crebs (D)
 . John A. Logan (R), until March 3, 1871

Indiana 
 . William E. Niblack (D)
 . Michael C. Kerr (D)
 . William S. Holman (D)
 . George W. Julian (R)
 . John Coburn (R)
 . Daniel W. Voorhees (D)
 . Godlove S. Orth (R)
 . James N. Tyner (R)
 . John P. C. Shanks (R)
 . William Williams (R)
 . Jasper Packard (R)

Iowa 
 . George W. McCrary (R)
 . William Smyth (R), until September 30, 1870
 William P. Wolf (R), from December 6, 1870
 . William B. Allison (R)
 . William Loughridge (R)
 . Francis W. Palmer (R)
 . Charles Pomeroy (R)

Kansas 
 . Sidney Clarke (R)

Kentucky 
 . Lawrence S. Trimble (D)
 . William N. Sweeney (D)
 . Jacob Golladay (D), until February 28, 1870
 Joseph H. Lewis (D), from May 10, 1870
 . J. Proctor Knott (D)
 . Boyd Winchester (D)
 . Thomas L. Jones (D)
 . James B. Beck (D)
 . George M. Adams (D)
 . John M. Rice (D)

Louisiana 
 . J. Hale Sypher (R), from November 7, 1870
 . Lionel A. Sheldon (R)
 . Chester B. Darrall (R)
 . Joseph P. Newsham (R), from May 23, 1870
 . Frank Morey (R)

Maine 
 . John Lynch (R)
 . Samuel P. Morrill (R)
 . James G. Blaine (R)
 . John A. Peters (R)
 . Eugene Hale (R)

Maryland 
 . Samuel Hambleton (D)
 . Stevenson Archer (D)
 . Thomas Swann (D)
 . Patrick Hamill (D)
 . Frederick Stone (D)

Massachusetts 
 . James Buffington (R)
 . Oakes Ames (R)
 . Ginery Twichell (R)
 . Samuel Hooper (R)
 . Benjamin F. Butler (R)
 . Nathaniel P. Banks (R)
 . George S. Boutwell (R), until March 12, 1869
 George M. Brooks (R), from November 2, 1869
 . George F. Hoar (R)
 . William B. Washburn (R)
 . Henry L. Dawes (R)

Michigan 
 . Fernando C. Beaman (R)
 . William L. Stoughton (R)
 . Austin Blair (R)
 . Thomas W. Ferry (R), until March 3, 1871
 . Omar D. Conger (R)
 . Randolph Strickland (R)

Minnesota 
 . Morton S. Wilkinson (R)
 . Eugene M. Wilson (D)

Mississippi 
 . George E. Harris (R), from February 23, 1870
 . Joseph L. Morphis (R), from February 23, 1870
 . Henry W. Barry (R), from April 8, 1870
 . George C. McKee (R), from February 23, 1870
 . Legrand W. Perce (R), from February 23, 1870

Missouri 
 . Erastus Wells (D)
 . Gustavus A. Finkelnburg (R)
 . James R. McCormick (D)
 . Sempronius H. Boyd (R)
 . Samuel S. Burdett (R)
 . Robert T. Van Horn (R)
 . Joel F. Asper (R)
 . John F. Benjamin (R)
 . David P. Dyer (R)

Nebraska 
 . John Taffe (R)

Nevada 
 . Thomas Fitch (R)

New Hampshire 
 . Jacob H. Ela (R)
 . Aaron F. Stevens (R)
 . Jacob Benton (R)

New Jersey 
 . William Moore (R)
 . Charles Haight (D)
 . John T. Bird (D)
 . John Hill (R)
 . Orestes Cleveland (D)

New York 
 . Henry A. Reeves (D)
 . John G. Schumaker (D)
 . Henry W. Slocum (D)
 . John Fox (D)
 . John Morrissey (D)
 . Samuel S. Cox (D)
 . Hervey C. Calkin (D)
 . James Brooks (D)
 . Fernando Wood (D)
 . Clarkson N. Potter (D)
 . George W. Greene (D), until February 17, 1870
 Charles H. Van Wyck (R), from February 17, 1870
 . John H. Ketcham (R)
 . John A. Griswold (D)
 . Stephen L. Mayham (D)
 . Adolphus H. Tanner (R)
 . Orange Ferriss (R)
 . William A. Wheeler (R)
 . Stephen Sanford (R)
 . Charles Knapp (R)
 . Addison H. Laflin (R)
 . Alexander H. Bailey (R)
 . John C. Churchill (R)
 . Dennis McCarthy (R)
 . George W. Cowles (R)
 . William H. Kelsey (R)
 . Giles W. Hotchkiss (R)
 . Hamilton Ward Sr. (R)
 . Noah Davis (R), until July 15, 1870
 Charles H. Holmes (R), from December 6, 1870
 . John Fisher (R)
 . David S. Bennett (R)
 . Porter Sheldon (R)

North Carolina 
 . Clinton L. Cobb (R)
 . David Heaton (R), until June 25, 1870
 Joseph Dixon (R), from December 5, 1870
 . Oliver H. Dockery (R)
 . John T. Deweese (R), until February 28, 1870
 John Manning Jr. (D), from December 7, 1870
 . Israel G. Lash (R)
 . Francis E. Shober (D)
 . Alexander H. Jones (R)

Ohio 
 . Peter W. Strader (D)
 . Job E. Stevenson (R)
 . Robert C. Schenck (R), until January 5, 1871
 . William Lawrence (R)
 . William Mungen (D)
 . John A. Smith (R)
 . James J. Winans (R)
 . John Beatty (R)
 . Edward F. Dickinson (D)
 . Truman H. Hoag (D), until February 5, 1870
 Erasmus D. Peck (R), from April 23, 1870
 . John T. Wilson (R)
 . Philadelph Van Trump (D)
 . George W. Morgan (D)
 . Martin Welker (R)
 . Eliakim H. Moore (R)
 . John Bingham (R)
 . Jacob A. Ambler (R)
 . William H. Upson (R)
 . James A. Garfield (R)

Oregon 
 . Joseph S. Smith (D)

Pennsylvania 
 . Samuel J. Randall (D)
 . Charles O'Neill (R)
 . John Moffet (D), until April 9, 1869
 Leonard Myers (R), from April 9, 1869
 . William D. Kelley (R)
 . John R. Reading (D), until April 13, 1870
 Caleb N. Taylor (R), from April 13, 1870
 . John D. Stiles (D)
 . Washington Townsend (R)
 . J. Lawrence Getz (D)
 . Oliver J. Dickey (R)
 . Henry L. Cake (R)
 . Daniel M. Van Auken (D)
 . George W. Woodward (D)
 . Ulysses Mercur (R)
 . John B. Packer (R)
 . Richard J. Haldeman (D)
 . John Cessna (R)
 . Daniel J. Morrell (R)
 . William H. Armstrong (R)
 . Glenni W. Scofield (R)
 . Calvin W. Gilfillan (R)
 . John Covode (R), February 9, 1870 – January 11, 1871
 . James S. Negley (R)
 . Darwin Phelps (R)
 . Joseph B. Donley (R)

Rhode Island 
 . Thomas A. Jenckes (R)
 . Nathan F. Dixon Jr. (R)

South Carolina 
 . B. Frank Whittemore (R), until February 24, 1870
 Joseph Rainey (R), from December 12, 1870
 . Christopher C. Bowen (R)
 . Solomon L. Hoge (R), from April 8, 1869
 . Alexander S. Wallace (R), from May 27, 1870

Tennessee 
 . Roderick R. Butler (R)
 . Horace Maynard (R)
 . William B. Stokes (R)
 . Lewis Tillman (R)
 . William F. Prosser (R)
 . Samuel M. Arnell (R)
 . Isaac R. Hawkins (R)
 . William J. Smith (R)

Texas 
 . George W. Whitmore (R), from March 30, 1870
 . John C. Conner (D), from March 31, 1870
 . William T. Clark (R), from March 31, 1870
 . Edward Degener (R), from March 31, 1870

Vermont 
 . Charles W. Willard (R)
 . Luke P. Poland (R)
 . Worthington C. Smith (R)

Virginia 
 . Richard S. Ayer (R), from January 31, 1870
 . James H. Platt Jr. (R), from January 26, 1870
 . Charles H. Porter (R), from January 26, 1870
 . George Booker (C), from January 26, 1870
 . Robert Ridgway (C), from January 27, 1870 – October 16, 1870
 Richard T. W. Duke (C), from November 8, 1870
 . William Milnes Jr. (C), from January 27, 1870
 . Lewis McKenzie (C), from January 31, 1870
 . James K. Gibson (C), from January 28, 1870

West Virginia 
 . Isaac H. Duval (R)
 . James C. McGrew (R)
 . John Witcher (R)

Wisconsin 
 . Halbert E. Paine (R)
 . Benjamin F. Hopkins (R), until January 1, 1870
 David Atwood (R), from February 23, 1870
 . Amasa Cobb (R)
 . Charles A. Eldredge (D)
 . Philetus Sawyer (R)
 . Cadwallader C. Washburn (R)

Non-voting members 
 . Richard C. McCormick (D)
 . Allen A. Bradford (R)
 . Solomon L. Spink (R)
 . Jacob K. Shafer (D)
 . James M. Cavanaugh (D)
 . J. Francisco Chaves (R)
 . William H. Hooper (D)
 . Selucius Garfielde (R)
 . Stephen F. Nuckolls (D), from December 6, 1869

Changes in membership
The count below reflects changes from the beginning of the first session of this Congress.

Senate 
 Replacements: 6
 Democratic: 1 seat net gain
 Republican: 1 seat net loss
 Deaths: 2
 Resignations:2
 Interim appointments: 2
 Seats of newly re-admitted states: 8
Total seats with changes: 14

|-
| Virginia (1)
| rowspan=2 | Vacant
| rowspan=2 | Virginia re-admitted to the Union
| nowrap  | John F. Lewis (R)
| rowspan=2 | January 26, 1870

|-
| Virginia (2)
| nowrap  | John W. Johnston (D)

|-
| Mississippi (1)
| rowspan=2 | Vacant
| rowspan=2 | Mississippi re-admitted to the Union
| nowrap  | Adelbert Ames (R)
| rowspan=2 | February 23, 1870

|-
| Mississippi (2)
| nowrap  | Hiram R Revels (R)

|-
| Texas (1)
| rowspan=2 | Vacant
| rowspan=2 | Texas re-admitted to the Union
| nowrap  | James W. Flanagan (R)
| March 30, 1870

|-
| Texas (2)
| nowrap  | Morgan C. Hamilton (R)
| March 31, 1870

|-
| Georgia (3)
| rowspan=2 | Vacant
| rowspan=2 | Georgia re-admitted to the Union
| nowrap  | Joshua Hill (R)
| February 1, 1871

|-
| Georgia (2)
| nowrap  | Homer V. M. Miller (D)
| February 28, 1871

|-
| Maine (2)
| nowrap  | William P. Fessenden (R)
| Died September 8, 1869.Successor appointed October 30, 1869.Successor was subsequently elected January 19, 1870 to finish the term.
| nowrap  | Lot M. Morrill (R)
| October 30, 1869

|-
| Iowa (2)
| nowrap  | James W. Grimes (R)
| Resigned December 6, 1869, because of failing health.Successor elected January 18, 1870.
| nowrap  | James B. Howell (R)
| January 18, 1870

|-
| Minnesota (2)
| nowrap  | Daniel S. Norton (R)
| Died July 13, 1870.Successor appointed July 15, 1870.
| nowrap  | William Windom (R)
| July 15, 1870

|-
| Missouri (3)
| nowrap  | Charles D. Drake (R)
| Resigned December 19, 1870, after being appointed chief justice of the United States Court of Claims.Successor appointed December 19, 1870.
| nowrap  | Daniel T. Jewett (R)
| December 19, 1870

|-
| Missouri (3)
| nowrap  | Daniel T. Jewett (R)
| Interim appointee retired.Successor elected January 20, 1871.
| nowrap  | Francis P. Blair Jr. (D)
| January 20, 1871

|-
| Minnesota (2)
| nowrap  | William Windom (R)
| Successor elected January 22, 1871.
| nowrap  | Ozora P. Stearns (R)
| January 22, 1871

|}

House of Representatives 
 Replacements: 14
 Democratic: 3 seat net loss
 Republican: 3 seat net gain
 Conservative Party of Virginia: no net change
 Deaths: 6
 Resignations: 6
 Contested election: 8
 Seats of newly re-admitted states: 17
Total seats with changes: 44

|-
| 
| Vacant
| style="font-size:80%" | Contested election with J.P. Reed. Reed was never seated. House declared Hoge entitled to seat.
| nowrap  | Solomon L. Hoge (R)
| April 8, 1869
|-
| 
| Vacant
| style="font-size:80%" | Territory organized in previous congress and remained vacant until December 6, 1869
| nowrap  | Stephen F. Nuckolls (D)
| December 6, 1869
|-
| 
| rowspan=8 | Vacant
| rowspan=8 style="font-size:80%" | Virginia re-admitted into the Union
| nowrap  | James H. Platt Jr. (R)
| rowspan=3 | January 26, 1870
|-
| 
| nowrap  | Charles H. Porter (R)
|-
| 
| nowrap  | George Booker (C)
|-
| 
| nowrap  | Robert Ridgway (C)
| rowspan=2 | January 27, 1870
|-
| 
| nowrap  | William Milnes Jr. (C)
|-
| 
| nowrap  | James K. Gibson (C)
| January 28, 1870
|-
| 
| nowrap  | Richard S. Ayer (R)
| rowspan=2 | January 31, 1870
|-
| 
| nowrap  | Lewis McKenzie (C)
|-
| 
| Vacant
| style="font-size:80%" | Contested election with Henry D. Foster. House declared neither was entitled to seat.  House then declared Covode duly elected February 9, 1870
| nowrap  | John Covode (R)
| February 9, 1870
|-
| 
| rowspan=5 | Vacant
| rowspan=5  style="font-size:80%" | Mississippi re-admitted into the Union
| nowrap  | George E. Harris (R)
| rowspan=5 | February 23, 1870
|-
| 
| nowrap  | Joseph L. Morphis (R)
|-
| 
| nowrap  | Henry W. Barry (R)
|-
| 
| nowrap  | George C. McKee (R)
|-
| 
| nowrap  | Legrand W. Perce (R)
|-
| 
| rowspan=4 | Vacant
| rowspan=4  style="font-size:80%" | Texas re-admitted into the Union
| nowrap  | George W. Whitmore (R)
| March 30, 1870
|-
| 
| nowrap  | John C. Conner (D)
| rowspan=3 | March 31, 1870
|-
| 
| nowrap  | William T. Clark (R)
|-
| 
| nowrap  | Edward Degener (R)
|-
| 
|  Vacant
| style="font-size:80%" | Contested election with Michael Ryan. House declared neither was entitled to seat.  Elected to seat thus caused
| nowrap  | Joseph P. Newsham (R)
| May 23, 1870
|-
| 
| Vacant
| style="font-size:80%" | Contested election with William D. Simpson.  Simpson was never seated. House declared Wallace entitled to seat.
| nowrap  | Alexander S. Wallace (R)
| May 27, 1870
|-
| 
| Vacant
| style="font-size:80%" | Contested election with Louis St. Martin. House declared neither was entitled to seat.  Elected to seat thus caused
| nowrap  | J. Hale Sypher (R)
| November 7, 1870
|-
| 
| rowspan=7 | Vacant
| style="font-size:80%" | Vacancy caused by House declaring Joseph W. Clift not entitled to seat
| nowrap  | William W. Paine (D)
| rowspan=7 | December 22, 1870
|-
| 
| style="font-size:80%" | Vacancy caused by House declaring Nelson Tift not entitled to seat
| nowrap  | Richard H. Whiteley (R)
|-
| 
| style="font-size:80%" | Vacancy caused by House declaring William P. Edwards not entitled to seat
| nowrap  | Marion Bethune (R)
|-
| 
| style="font-size:80%" | Vacancy caused by House declaring Samuel F. Gove not entitled to seat
| nowrap  | Jefferson F. Long (R)
|-
| 
| style="font-size:80%" | Vacancy caused by House declaring Charles H. Prince not entitled to seat
| nowrap  | Stephen A. Corker (D)
|-
| 
| style="font-size:80%" | Failure to elect
| nowrap  | William P. Price (D)
|-
| 
| style="font-size:80%" | Vacancy caused by House declaring Pierce M. B. Young not entitled to seat.  He was subsequently elected to fill the vacancy thus caused
| nowrap  | Pierce M. B. Young (D)
|-
| 
| nowrap  | Elihu B. Washburne (R)
| style="font-size:80%" | Resigned March 6, 1869, after being appointed United States Secretary of State
| nowrap  | Horatio C. Burchard (R)
| December 6, 1869
|-
| 
| nowrap  | George S. Boutwell (R)
| style="font-size:80%" | Resigned March 12, 1869, after being appointed United States Secretary of the Treasury
| nowrap  | George M. Brooks (R)
| November 2, 1869
|-
| 
| nowrap  | John Moffet (D)
| style="font-size:80%" | Lost contested election April 9, 1869
| nowrap  | Leonard Myers (R)
| April 9, 1869
|-
| 
| nowrap  | Benjamin F. Hopkins (R)
| style="font-size:80%" | Died January 1, 1870
| nowrap  | David Atwood (R)
| February 23, 1870
|-
| 
| nowrap  | Truman H. Hoag (D)
| style="font-size:80%" | Died February 5, 1870
| nowrap  | Erasmus D. Peck (R)
| April 23, 1870
|-
| 
| nowrap  | George W. Greene (D)
| style="font-size:80%" | Lost contested election February 17, 1870
| nowrap  | Charles Van Wyck (R)
| February 17, 1870
|-
| 
| nowrap  | Benjamin F. Whittemore (R)
| style="font-size:80%" | Resigned February 24, 1870, pending an investigation of certain appointments to the US Military and Naval Academies
| nowrap  | Joseph Rainey (R)
| December 12, 1870
|-
| 
| nowrap  | Jacob Golladay (D)
| style="font-size:80%" | Resigned February 28, 1870
| nowrap  | Joseph H. Lewis (D)
| May 10, 1870
|-
| 
| nowrap  | John T. Deweese (R)
| style="font-size:80%" | Resigned February 28, 1870, pending an investigation of certain appointments to the US Military and Naval Academies
| nowrap  | John Manning Jr. (D)
| December 7, 1870
|-
| 
| nowrap  | John R. Reading (D)
| style="font-size:80%" | Lost contested election April 13, 1870
| nowrap  | Caleb N. Taylor (R)
| April 13, 1870
|-
| 
| nowrap  | David Heaton (R)
| style="font-size:80%" | Died June 25, 1870
| nowrap  | Joseph Dixon (R)
| December 5, 1870
|-
| 
| nowrap  | Noah Davis (R)
| style="font-size:80%" | Resigned July 15, 1870, before being appointed U.S. Attorney for the Southern District of New York
| nowrap  | Charles H. Holmes (R)
| December 6, 1870
|-
| 
| nowrap  | William Smyth (R)
| style="font-size:80%" | Died September 30, 1870
| nowrap  | William P. Wolf (R)
| December 6, 1870
|-
| 
| nowrap  | Robert Ridgway (C)
| style="font-size:80%" | Died October 16, 1870
| nowrap  | Richard T. W. Duke (C)
| November 8, 1870
|-
| 
| nowrap  | Robert C. Schenck (R)
| style="font-size:80%" | Resigned January 5, 1871, after being appointed U.S. Ambassador to the United Kingdom
| Vacant
| Not filled this Congress
|-
| 
| nowrap  | John Covode (R)
| style="font-size:80%" | Died January 11, 1871
| Vacant
| Not filled this Congress
|-
| 
| nowrap  | John A. Logan (R)
| style="font-size:80%" | Resigned at end of congress March 3, 1871, after being elected to the US Senate for the following term
| Vacant
| Not filled this Congress
|-
| 
| nowrap  | Thomas W. Ferry (R)
| style="font-size:80%" | Resigned at end of congress March 3, 1871, after being elected to the US Senate for the following term
| Vacant
| Not filled this Congress
|}

Committees

Senate

 Agriculture (Chairman: Simon Cameron; Ranking Member: Abijah Gilbert)
 Appropriations (Chairman: Lot M. Morrill; Ranking Member: William Sprague IV)
 Audit and Control the Contingent Expenses of the Senate (Chairman: Orris S. Ferry; Ranking Member: Garrett Davis)
 Claims (Chairman: Timothy O. Howe; Ranking Member: Thomas J. Robertson)
 Commerce (Chairman: Zachariah Chandler; Ranking Member: Roscoe Conkling)
 Distributing Public Revenue Among the States (Select)
 District of Columbia (Chairman: James W. Patterson; Ranking Member: John S. Harris)
 Education (Chairman: Frederick A. Sawyer; Ranking Member: Henry W. Corbett)
 Engrossed Bills (Chairman: William A. Buckingham; Ranking Member: Daniel S. Norton)
 Finance (Chairman: John Sherman; Ranking Member: Willard Warner)
 Foreign Relations (Chairman: Charles Sumner; Ranking Member: Oliver P. Morton) 
 Indian Affairs (Chairman: James Harlan; Ranking Member: William A. Buckingham)
 Judiciary (Chairman: Lyman Trumbull; Ranking Member: Benjamin F. Rice) 
 Manufactures (Chairman: Oliver P. Morton; Ranking Member: Arthur I. Boreman)
 Memorial of Davis Hatch (Select)
 Military Affairs and the Militia (Chairman: Henry Wilson; Ranking Member: John M. Thayer)
 Mines and Mining (Chairman: William M. Stewart; Ranking Member: Edmund G. Ross)
 Mississippi River Levee System (Select)
 Naval Affairs (Chairman: Aaron H. Cragin; Ranking Member: Charles D. Drake)
 Ordnance and War Ships (Select)
 Outrages in Southern States (Select)
 Pacific Railroad (Chairman: Jacob M. Howard; Ranking Member: Charles D. Drake)
 Patents (Chairman: Waitman T. Willey; Ranking Member: Thomas W. Osborn)
 Pensions (Chairman: George F. Edmunds; Ranking Member: William G. Brownlow)
 Post Office and Post Roads (Chairman: Alexander Ramsey; Ranking Member: Cornelius Cole)
 Private Land Claims (Chairman: George H. Williams; Ranking Member: William P. Kellogg)
 Public Buildings and Grounds (Chairman: Justin S. Morrill; Ranking Member: Adolphus H. Tanner)
 Public Lands (Chairman: Samuel C. Pomeroy; Ranking Member: Willard Warner)
 Removal of Political Disabilities (Select) (Chairman: Henry B. Anthony; Ranking Member: Orris S. Ferry)
 Retrenchment (Chairman: John S. Harris; Ranking Member: Carl Schurz)
 Revision of the Laws (Chairman: Roscoe Conkling; Ranking Member: John Pool)
 Revolutionary Claims (Chairman: Richard Yates; Ranking Member: William G. Brownlow)
 Rules (Select)
 Tariff Regulation (Select)
 Territories (Chairman: James W. Nye; Ranking Member: Jacob M. Howard)
 Traffic with Rebels in Texas (Select)
 Whole

House of Representatives

 Accounts (Chairman: Henry L. Cake; Ranking Member: Aaron A. Sargent) 
 Agriculture (Chairman: John T. Wilson; Ranking Member: Jacob Benton)
 Appropriations (Chairman: Henry L. Dawes; Ranking Member: Aaron A. Sargent)
 Banking and Currency (Chairman: James A. Garfield; Ranking Member: John B. Packer) 
 Claims (Chairman: William B. Washburn; Ranking Member: Jacob H. Ela)
 Coinage, Weights and Measures (Chairman: William D. Kelley; Ranking Member: Noah Davis)
 Commerce (Chairman: Nathan F. Dixon; Ranking Member: David S. Bennett)
 District of Columbia (Chairman: Burton C. Cook; Ranking Member: Charles M. Hamilton)
 Education and Labor (Chairman: Samuel M. Arnell; Ranking Member: Samuel S. Burdett) 
 Elections (Chairman: Halbert E. Paine; Ranking Member: Job E. Stevenson)
 Expenditures in the Interior Department (Chairman: Jacob H. Ela; Ranking Member: Peter W. Strader)
 Expenditures in the Navy Department (Chairman: John Lynch; Ranking Member: Patrick Hamill)
 Expenditures in the Post Office Department (Chairman: William Moore; Ranking Member: John F. Benjamin)
 Expenditures in the State Department (Chairman: Alexander H. Bailey; Ranking Member: John D. Stiles)
 Expenditures in the Treasury Department (Chairman: William B. Allison; Ranking Member: Samuel J. Randall)
 Expenditures in the War Department (Chairman: William Williams; Ranking Member: Clinton L. Cobb)
 Expenditures on Public Buildings (Chairman: John C. Churchill; Ranking Member: Truman H. Hoag)
 Freedmen's Affairs (Chairman: Oliver H. Dockery; Ranking Member: John B. Hawley)
 Foreign Affairs (Chairman: Nathaniel P. Banks; Ranking Member: Charles W. Willard)
 Indian Affairs (Chairman: Sidney Clarke; Ranking Member: John T. Deweese)
 Invalid Pensions (Chairman: John F. Benjamin; Ranking Member: Christopher C. Bowen)
 Judiciary (Chairman: John A. Bingham; Ranking Member: Ulysses Mercur) 
 Manufactures (Chairman: Daniel J. Morrell; Ranking Member: William H. Upson)
 Mileage (Chairman: Isaac R. Hawkins; Ranking Member: Job E. Stevenson)
 Military Affairs (Chairman: John A. Logan; Ranking Member: John S. Witcher)
 Militia (Chairman: John P. C. Shanks; Ranking Member: Eliakim H. Moore)
 Mines and Mining (Chairman: Orange Ferriss; Ranking Member: Isaac H. Duval)
 Naval Affairs (Chairman: Glenni W. Scofield; Ranking Member: George W. McCrary)
 Pacific Railroads (Chairman: William A. Wheeler; Ranking Member: Logan H. Roots)
 Patents (Chairman: Thomas A. Jenckes; Ranking Member: James A. Johnson)
 Post Office and Post Roads (Chairman: John F. Farnsworth; Ranking Member: James N. Tyner)
 Private Land Claims (Chairman: Godlove Stein Orth; Ranking Member: Cadwallader C. Washburn)
 Public Buildings and Grounds (Chairman: John Beatty)
 Public Expenditures (Chairman: John Coburn)
 Public Lands (Chairman: George W. Julian; Ranking Member: James J. Winans)
 Railways and Canals (Chairman: Ebon C. Ingersoll; Ranking Member: William F. Prosser)
 Revision of Laws (Chairman: Luke P. Poland; Ranking Member: George F. Hoar)
 Revolutionary Claims (Chairman: Sempronius H. Boyd; Ranking Member: Alexander H. Jones) 
 Revolutionary Pensions and War of 1812 (Chairman: Charles W. Willard; Ranking Member: Roderick R. Butler)
 Rules (Select) (Chairman: Schuyler Colfax; Ranking Member: James A. Garfield)
 Standards of Official Conduct
 Territories (Chairman: Shelby M. Cullom; Ranking Member: Eliakim H. Moore)
 Ways and Means (Chairman: Samuel Hooper; Ranking Member: James Brooks)
 Whole

Joint committees

 Conditions of Indian Tribes (Special)
 Enrolled Bills (Chairman: Rep. John Beatty; Vice Chairman: Rep. Joseph C. Abbott)
 The Library (Chairman: Rep. John A. Peters; Vice Chairman: Rep. George A. Woodward)
 Printing (Chairman: Rep. Addison H. Laflin; Vice Chairman: Rep. William Mungen)
 Retrenchment (Chairman: Rep. Martin Welker; Vice Chairman: Rep. Thomas A. Jenckes)

Caucuses 
 Democratic (House)
 Democratic (Senate)

Employees

Legislative branch agency directors 
 Architect of the Capitol: Edward Clark
 Librarian of Congress: Ainsworth Rand Spofford

Senate 
 Chaplain: John P. Newman (Methodist)
 Secretary: George C. Gorham
 Sergeant at Arms: George T. Brown, until March 22, 1869
 John R. French, elected March 22, 1869

House of Representatives 
 Chaplain: John G. Butler (Presbyterian)
 Clerk: Edward McPherson
 Clerk at the Speaker's Table: John M. Barclay
 Doorkeeper: Otis S. Buxton
 Postmaster: William S. King
 Reading Clerks: Charles N. Clisbee (D) and William K. Mehaffey (R)
 Sergeant at Arms: Nehemiah G. Ordway

See also 
 1868 United States elections (elections leading to this Congress)
 1868 United States presidential election
 1868–69 United States Senate elections
 1868–69 United States House of Representatives elections
 1870 United States elections (elections during this Congress, leading to the next Congress)
 1870–71 United States Senate elections
 1870–71 United States House of Representatives elections

Notes

References

Bibliography

External links
 Statutes at Large, 1789-1875
 Senate Journal, First Forty-three Sessions of Congress
 House Journal, First Forty-three Sessions of Congress
 Biographical Directory of the U.S. Congress
 U.S. House of Representatives: House History
 U.S. Senate: Statistics and Lists